The men's doubles was one of four lawn tennis events on the Tennis at the 1906 Intercalated Games programme. The tournament was played on clay courts at the Athens Lawn Tennis Club.

Frenchmen Max Decugis and Maurice Germot won the gold medal by defeating Greeks Ioannis Ballis and Xenophon Kasdaglis in five sets.

This is one of two events that featured a specific match to determine the bronze medal winner (the other being the women's doubles), in which Bohemians Ladislav Žemla and Zdeněk Žemla defeated Greeks Georgios Simiriotis and Nikolaos Zarifis in straight sets.

Draw

Draw

References

External links
  ITF, 2008 Olympic Tennis Event Media Guide
 Official results archive (ITF)

1906

Tennis at the 1906 Intercalated Games